The Autovía A-2 (also called Autovia del Nordeste and Avenida de América) is a Spanish autovía and autopista route which starts in Madrid and ends in Barcelona. It replaces the former N-II.

Sections

Major cities crossed

Madrid
Guadalajara
Zaragoza
Fraga
Lleida
Martorell
Barcelona

External links
Autovía A-2 in Google Maps

See also
 Avenida de América (Madrid Metro)

A-2
A-2
A-2
A-2
A-2
A-2
European route E90 in Spain